was a Japanese statesman, regent and kugyō during the late Heian period. He is the founder of the Konoe family and the father of Konoe Motomichi.

Life and career 
Motozane was born in 1143, to his father Fujiwara no Tadamichi.

Motozane married the daughter of Fujiwara no Tadataka, whom he later divorced, and remarried to Taira no Moriko, the fourth daughter of Taira no Kiyomori. At the age of 16 he assumed the position of kampaku, regent, to Emperor Nijō, becoming the head of the Fujiwara clan. He died at the age of 24, a year after he became sesshō, or regent, to Emperor Rokujō, leaving his wife Taira no Moriko windowed at the age of 12.

His descendants later came to be known as the Konoe family, one of the Five sessho families, taking its name from Motozane's Kyoto residence on Konoe-Ōji (近衛大道) road.

Family
 Father: Fujiwara no Tadamichi
Mother: Minamoto no Kunizane's daughter
Legal wife (正室): Taira no Moriko, Taira no Kiyomori's daughter
 Wife: Fujiwara no Tadataka's daughter
 Eldest son: Konoe Motomichi (1160-1233)
 Wife: Fujiwara no Akisuke's daughter
 Second son: Awataguchi Tadayoshi (1164-1225)
 Daughter: Konoe Michiko (b.1163) married Emperor Takakura
 Wife: Minamoto no Moritsune's daughter
 ??? (覚尊)
 unknown
 ??? (祐覚)
 ??? (道鑑)

References 

Fujiwara clan
Konoe family
1143 births
1166 deaths
People of Heian-period Japan